Factory Bridge, also known as Horsham Bridge, is a historic wooden covered bridge in White Deer Township, Union County, Pennsylvania. It crosses the White Deer Creek.

It was listed on the National Register of Historic Places in 1980.

References

Covered bridges on the National Register of Historic Places in Pennsylvania
Covered bridges in Union County, Pennsylvania
Bridges completed in 1880
Wooden bridges in Pennsylvania
Bridges in Union County, Pennsylvania
National Register of Historic Places in Union County, Pennsylvania
Road bridges on the National Register of Historic Places in Pennsylvania
Queen post truss bridges in the United States
King post truss bridges in the United States